Beeban Tania Kidron, Baroness Kidron,  (born 2 May 1961) is a British filmmaker and an advocate for children's rights in the digital world.

Kidron is Chair of 5Rights Foundation, a charity that delivers children's rights for young people online, and the joint founder of the education charity Into Film (previously FilmClub), which uses film to educate and inspire state school children aged 5–19.

As a director she is best known for directing an adaptation of Jeanette Winterson's autobiographical novel Oranges Are Not the Only Fruit and Bridget Jones: The Edge of Reason.

Early life and education
Kidron was born in north London, to Nina and Michael Kidron. Her parents were the founders and proprietors of the independent publishing house Pluto Press, which started life from the laundry room of their family home. Michael's family were South African Jews who immigrated to Israel. Michael left Israel to attend Oxford University. He went on to teach economics, and the family spent several years living in Yorkshire while he taught at the University of Hull.
Beeban attended Camden School for Girls in Sandall Road, Camden.
She first took up photography when she was given a camera by landscape photographer Fay Godwin during a period when she was unable to speak following a throat operation. Her photographs were spotted by photographer Eve Arnold, whom she worked for at the age of 16 for two years. Aged 20, Kidron enrolled at the National Film School as a camerawoman. At the end of her three years of film school, Kidron switched to directing and stayed on for another year.

Film career
Kidron began making documentaries in the 80s. In 1983, she made her first documentary, Carry Greenham Home, with co-director Amanda Richardson. It was filmed during the year that they spent at the Greenham Common Women's Peace Camp during the anti nuclear protests. The film was shown at the Berlin Film Festival and, to celebrate Greenham's 25th anniversary, it was revived through The Guardian-backed website, www.yourgreenham.com.

In 1988, she made her first feature film, Vroom, which starred Clive Owen in his debut film. The following year she came to greater prominence with her adaptation of Jeanette Winterson's autobiographical novel Oranges Are Not the Only Fruit. This won three Baftas including best drama series/serial. In 2010 The Guardian named Oranges the eighth best TV series of all time.

Following the success of Oranges, Kidron continued to work for the BBC, making the TV feature film Antonia and Jane, distributed by Miramax in the US, as well as Itch starring and co-written by Alexei Sayle for Channel 4's 4 Play anthology series. In 1992 Kidron moved to Hollywood to make Used People with Shirley MacLaine and Marcello Mastroianni. The following year, she directed Hookers, Hustlers, Pimps and Their Johns, a documentary about the New York City sex industry. She then returned to the UK to pair up with Winterson for the BBC film Great Moments in Aviation starring Vanessa Redgrave and Jonathan Pryce, which was subsequently renamed Shades of Fear by Miramax CEO Harvey Weinstein.

The 1990s and early 2000s saw Kidron move between Hollywood, New York and London, making features, TV programmes and documentaries. In 1995, she made To Wong Foo, Thanks for Everything! Julie Newmar, a drag queen road movie starring Wesley Snipes and Patrick Swayze. 1997 brought Swept from the Sea, a romantic adaptation of the Joseph Conrad story "Amy Foster", starring Rachel Weisz and Vincent Perez, which Variety called "masterfully crafted and heartfelt". Over the next few years Kidron made a number of TV films both at home and abroad, including Cinderella, Texarkana and Murder, for which she was nominated for a second Bafta. In 2004 she directed the second installment of the Bridget Jones series, Bridget Jones: The Edge of Reason, starring Renée Zellweger, Colin Firth, and Hugh Grant.

In 2007 she made a documentary about neighbour and friend, the sculptor Antony Gormley. Kidron and her husband, playwright and author of Billy Elliot, Lee Hall, began work on Hippie Hippie Shake, a film about the Oz magazine trials. The film was shot in 2009 with Sienna Miller and Cillian Murphy; however Kidron and Hall left during post-production, citing artistic differences with the producers.

Kidron spent much of 2010 in Southern India researching and shooting a documentary on the Devadasi. Sex, Death and the Gods premiered on BBC 4 as part of the Storyville series.

In 2013 Kidron directed the documentary InRealLife, a co-production between Cross Street Films and Studio Lambert. The film explored teenagers and their relationship to the internet. It was this film that acted as a catalyst for her campaign work around children's rights in the online world.

Following a period away from feature films, Kidron produced the Stephen Frears-directed Victoria & Abdul, which was released in 2017. It was the first feature film produced by Cross Street Films, and starred Judi Dench as Queen Victoria and Ali Fazal as Abdul Karim. To Wong Foo, Thanks for Everything! Julie Newmar was rereleased in 2019 and was named by the New York Times as among the top ten comedies on Netflix.

Filmclub and Into Film
Kidron started Filmclub in September 2006 with Lindsey Makie. Filmclub is an educational charity which sets up after-school film clubs in schools in England and Wales. The scheme is free to all state primary and secondary schools. The organisation was founded in September 2006, and after a successful pilot in 2007 launched by then Chancellor Gordon Brown, Filmclub officially launched across the country in June 2009.

Filmclub gives children from participating schools access to thousands of films and organises school visits by professionals from within the film industry. Pupils are encouraged to watch a diverse range of films including blockbusters, classics, black and white movies and foreign language titles, and to review the films they watch on the organisation's website (www.filmclub.org). The clubs are generally run by teachers or a similar education professional, but may also be led by older pupils, often from a school's 6th Form.

In 2013, Filmclub merged with First Light to become the film-based charity, Into Film. As well as running film clubs in schools, Into Film runs a youth film festival and youth film awards.

Kidron talks of the journey of Filmclub in her TED talk, The Shared Wonder of Film.

Peerage and honour
Kidron was appointed Officer of the Order of the British Empire (OBE) in the 2012 Birthday Honours for services to drama.

On 25 June 2012, Kidron was created a life peer as Baroness Kidron, of Angel in the London Borough of Islington, and was introduced in the House of Lords the following day. She was appointed on the recommendation of the House of Lords Appointments Commission and sits as a crossbencher.

From 2019 to present, Kidron sits on the House of Lords Democracy and Digital Technologies Committee, having previously been on the Lords Communications Select Committee and contributed to the 2017 House of Lords "Growing up with the Internet" report. as well as reports; “BBC Charter Renewal: Reith Not Revolution” (2016), “A Privatised Future for Channel 4?” (2016), “Skills for Theatre: Developing the Pipeline of Talent” (2017), “UK Advertising in a Digital Age” (2018), “Regulating in a Digital World” (2019) and “Public Service Broadcasting: As Vital as Ever” (2019).

5Rights Foundation and youth advocacy
Kidron is the Founder and Chair of 5Rights Foundation, an organisation she established in 2013 to promote the rights of children online. At the launch she described it as a civil society initiative that aims to make the digital world a more transparent and empowering place for children and young people. 5Rights signatories include Unicef, the NSPCC and Barclays bank. Starting out as the iRights campaign, in 2018 it was formally registered as a charity formally constituted as The 5Rights Foundation.

5 Rights Foundation states that its mission is to build the digital world children and young people deserve. It develops policy, regulation and innovative approaches to digital issues on behalf of children and young people, working with an interdisciplinary network of experts. 5Rights has pioneered a range of international policies and programmes, such as; developing Child Online Protection Policy for the Government of Rwanda; contributing to the creation of a General Comment (codicil) on the digital world, to the Convention on the Rights of the Child (UNCRC); and working in partnership with IEEE Standards to create Universal Standards for Children and for Digital Services and Products.

Kidron is also a member of the UNESCO Broadband Commission for Sustainable Development, a UN commission set up to support the 2030 Sustainable Development Goals;, a member of the Global Council for Extended Intelligence; a member of the UNICEF Artificial Intelligence and Child Rights policy guidance group; and sat on the WeProtect Child Dignity Alliance Technical Working Group.

Age Appropriate Design Code 

Kidron, gaining cross-party support, introduced an amendment to The Data Protection Act 2018 that gave effect to the requirement to offer children specific data protection. That amendment became section 123 of the Act and required the Information Commissioner to introduce a code of data protection standards that would protect children by making online services ‘age appropriate’. When a draft Age Appropriate Design Code was put forward by the Information Commissioner in January 2020, Baroness Kidron stated “Children and their parents have long been left with all of the responsibility but no control. Meanwhile, the tech sector has, against all rationale, been left with all the control but no responsibility. The Code will change this. It is the first piece of regulation anywhere in the world to explicitly prevent children’s data being exploited in ways that undermine their safety and wellbeing.” The Code will apply to all online services ‘likely to be accessed’ by a child, including web services and video games, and requires such services to have regard to the different needs of children at different stages of their development and the UK's obligations under the United Nations Convention on the Rights of the Child (UNCRC). In June 2020, the UK Government laid the Code before parliament making it the first piece of legislation of its kind and in doing so establishing that data protection is a powerful tool for delivering a better experience for children online. The Code came into effect in September 2021.

In September 2021, the ICO approved the first certification criteria for the Age Appropriate Design Code. As of November 2021, there are 3 approved certification criteria for UK GDPR, including those related to the Age Appropriate Design Code:

 ADISA ICT Asset Recovery Certification 8.0 
 Age Check Certification Scheme (ACCS) 
 Age Appropriate Design Certification Scheme (AADCS)

Several United States lawmakers supported the Age Appropriate Design Code, writing a joint letter to American video game developers and publishers urging them to follow the practices within the Code even though it does not apply to American companies.

Other roles 
Kidron was awarded an honorary doctorate from Kingston University in 2010 for her contribution to education. She became a board member of the UK Film Council in 2008 with a mandate to provide film education. Following the dissolution of the Film Council, she became a governor of the BFI. In March 2015, she was awarded the Grassroot Diplomat Initiative Award under the Social Driver category for her extensive work on Filmclub and the iRights Framework used to empower young people on the use of social media and the internet. This was the first award she had won for her campaigning work.

Kidron was a member of the Joint Arts Council England and Durham University Commission on Creativity and Education from 2018, is a patron of Law Action Worldwide and was previously was a member of the Royal Foundation's Taskforce for the Prevention of Cyberbullying, chaired by HRH Duke of Cambridge. She is a frequent speaker and contributor on all aspects of children's digital interactions and the need for human-centred system design. From 2016 to 2019 Kidron was a visiting fellow at Lady Margaret Hall at Oxford University. Kidron was a member of the Growing Up Digital Taskforce for the Children's Commissioner's Growing Up Digital report in 2017.

Personal life
Kidron is married to playwright Lee Hall. She has two children Noah and Blaze Kidron-Style.

Filmography

Awards and nominations

See also
 List of members of the House of Lords
 List of female film and television directors
 List of LGBT-related films directed by women

References

External links
 5 Rights Foundation
 
 
 "Social media giants will finally be held responsible for children like Molly Russell", Baroness Kidron writing for The Telegraph, 22 January 2020
 "Baroness Kidron: Silicon Valley's unlikely but powerful adversary", The Telegraph, 27 October 2019
 ‘The Guardian Angels making the internet a safer place for children’ The Times, 2 June 2019
 ‘The Baroness fighting to save children online’ New York Times, 27 August 2019
 The 5rights Campaign: Baroness Beeban Kidron at TEDxPlaceDesNations, March 2016
 Baroness Kidron interview: ‘Children’s online safety is too vital to leave to Government’, Interview in The Independent, 27 October 2014
 Beeban Kidron: 'We need to talk about teenagers and the internet', The Guardian, 8 September 2013
 10 things I hate about the Internet: Baroness Beeban Kidron at TEDxHousesofParliament, June 2013
 Beeban Kidron on The shared wonder of film, TED Talk, June 2012
 "Sex, Death and the Gods", BBC Four.
 Baroness Kidron, Grassroot Diplomat.
 Hilary Whitney, "Interview: Film Director Beeban Kidron", The Arts Desk, 21 January 2011.
 "Beeban Kidron on the devadasi system" as told to Joanna Moorhead, The Guardian, 21 January 2011.
 Tom Lamont, "The film that changed my life: Beeban Kidron", The Observer, 1 August 2010.
 "Welcome to Greenham".
 National Film and Television School.
 Stephen Armstrong, "Filmclub takes international news into schools", The Guardian, 14 June 2010.
 "Beeban Kidron speaks to Filmclub member Emma about Closing the Gap". YouTube.
 Beeban Kidron website.
 Beeban Kidron biography, Women make Movies.
 Sue Fox, "How We met; Eve Arnold and Beeban Kidron", The Independent, 12 May 1996.

British film directors
British television directors
British Jews
British women film directors
Officers of the Order of the British Empire
Prix Italia winners
1961 births
Living people
Crossbench life peers
WFTV Award winners
People's peers
British women television directors
Life peeresses created by Elizabeth II
Alumni of the National Film and Television School